Major-General Thomas Anthony Richardson  (9 August 1922 – 26 March 2015) was a British Army officer who took part in the Normandy landings in June 1944, the liberation of Brussels, and the forced crossing of the Rhine.

Biography
Richardson was born on 9 August 1922 in Egypt to a military family: he was the eldest son of Major-General T W Richardson. Tony was educated at Wellington College.

He enlisted into the Essex Yeomanry and served in the Normandy landings, the capture of Lille and the advances on Nijmegen and Arnhem. After the war he studied at the   Staff College and became an instructor at the Military College of Science. In 1958 he joined the Directorate of Land/Air Warfare in the War Office, working on the introduction of helicopters into the Army Air Corps, for which he was appointed MBE.

In a varied and distinguished career, he served with the Royal Horse Artillery (RHA) in Germany and at the Ministry of Defence as military assistant to the Deputy Chief of the General Staff. He served as Commander Royal Artillery of 2 Division in the Army of the Rhine in 1967, and then became Director of Army Aviation in 1971. He later went to New Delhi as Defence Advisor to the British High Commission.

He was appointed CB in 1974 and retired from the Army in 1997.

Personal life
He married twice. Firstly, he married Katherine Joanna Roberts in 1945: they had two children. Following her death, he married Anthea Fry, daughter of Professor Dennis Butler Fry in 1991.

Richardson died on 26 March 2015, aged 92.

References

1922 births
2015 deaths
Egyptian military personnel
British Army major generals
British Army personnel of World War II
Royal Artillery officers
Royal Horse Artillery officers
Companions of the Order of the Bath
Members of the Order of the British Empire
Essex Yeomanry soldiers
People educated at Wellington College, Berkshire
Graduates of the Staff College, Camberley